Crown Hotel may refer to:

Hotels
Crown Hotel, Liverpool, Merseyside, England
Crown Hotel, Nantwich, Cheshire, England
Crown Hotel, Poole, Dorset, England
Crown Hotel, Sydney, Australia
Crown Spa Hotel, formerly Crown Hotel, Scarborough, North Yorkshire, England
Crown Hotel (Siloam Springs, Arkansas), U.S.
The Crown (hotel), Amersham, Buckinghamshire, England

Other uses
Crown Hotel (Mona Lisa Black Background), a 1982 painting by Jean-Michel Basquiat

See also

 Crown Inn (disambiguation)
Pub names
The Three Crowns Hotel, Chagford, Devon, England
Crown Regency Hotel and Towers, Cebu City, Philippines
Crowne Plaza, a hotel chain
Crowne Plaza Liverpool John Lennon Airport Hotel, Merseyside, England